This article contains information about the literary events and publications of 1569.

Events
 September 28 – First complete printed Bible in Spanish translation (La Biblia, known from its title-page illustration as "Biblia del Oso" ("Bible of the Bear")), made by Casiodoro de Reina, published in Basel.
 undated – Performance of the 14th-century York Mystery Plays in England is suppressed.

New books

Prose
Henry de Bracton (died c. 1268) – De legibus & consuetudinibus Angliæ (On the Laws and Customs of England), first printed
Robert Henryson (died c. 1500) – The Morall Fabillis of Esope the Phrygian, publication begins
Magdeburge Centurien (Magdeburg Centuries), volume XII
Philips of Marnix, Lord of Saint-Aldegonde – Biëncorf der Heilige Roomsche Kercke (Beehive of the Holy Roman Church, satire)

Drama
Thomas Preston –  ("Cambyses", publication)

Poetry
See 1569 in poetry
Alonso de Ercilla – La Araucana, part 1

Births
January 2 – Heribert Rosweyde, Netherlandish hagiographer (died 1629)
April 16 – Sir John Davies, English poet (died 1626)
c. December? – Henry Ainsworth, English theologian (died 1622)
Unknown dates
Guillén de Castro y Bellvis, Spanish dramatist (died 1631)
Heo Gyun, Korean politician, scholar, and writer (died 1618)
Emilia Lanier, English poet (died 1645)
Hieronymus Medices, Italian philosopher and editor of work of Thomas Aquinas
Piotr Zbylitowski, Polish poet and satirist (died 1649)
probable – Barnabe Barnes, English poet and dramatist (baptised 1571; died 1609)

Deaths
January 20 – Myles Coverdale, English Bible translator (born c. 1488)
May 10 – Saint John of Avila, Spanish preacher and author (born 1500)
September 5 – Bernardo Tasso, Italian poet (born 1493)
September/October – Mikołaj Rej, Polish poet and author (born 1505)
November 29 – António Ferreira, Portuguese poet (born 1528)
Unknown date – Georg Pictorius, German physician and author (born c. 1500)

References

Years of the 16th century in literature